The 2002 Horizon League men's basketball tournament took place at the end of the 2001–02 regular season. The tournament was hosted by Cleveland State University.

Notably, this was the first men's basketball tournament that the conference held under its current identity as the Horizon League; the conference was originally known as the Midwestern City Conference and later as the Midwestern Collegiate Conference. It was also the last Horizon League tournament for more than a decade to be held at a single, predetermined site. From 2003 through 2015, the tournament was played at campus locations. The next tournament to take place at a neutral site was the 2016 edition, held at Joe Louis Arena in Detroit.

Seeds
All Horizon League schools played in the tournament. Teams were seeded by 2001–02 Horizon League season record, with a tiebreaker system to seed teams with identical conference records. The top 7 teams received a bye to the quarterfinals.

Bracket

References

Tournament
Horizon League men's basketball tournament
Horizon League men's basketball tournament
Horizon League men's basketball tournament
Basketball competitions in Cleveland
College sports tournaments in Ohio